William Malory Bird (February 2, 1889 – October 5, 1967) was a Canadian politician. He served in the Legislative Assembly of New Brunswick as member of the Progressive Conservative party from 1952 to 1960.

References

1889 births
1967 deaths
20th-century Canadian legislators
Progressive Conservative Party of New Brunswick MLAs
People from Madawaska County, New Brunswick